Mummy and Daddy is the fifteenth studio album by power electronics band Whitehouse, released in early 1998 through Susan Lawly. The album mostly focuses on domestic violence and is considered by many to be one of the band's darkest recordings. The cover art was illustrated by Trevor Brown, who previously worked with the band for their albums Quality Time, Halogen, and Twice Is Not Enough.

Recording
William Bennett considers the album as one of the scariest recordings he has ever made. In the liner notes for the album, he says:
This album is actually quite a worrying one for me. There is a neurosis about some of this work that is genuinely shocking and reaches an intensity that even I could never have dreamt of discovering. There is no explicit sexual content whatsoever - some of the themes cover domestic violence and abuse, subjects that held little interest to me until relatively recently. It will be a sexy record though, in my opinion - but not in the way most people would recognise. In fact, I think a lot of Whitehouse fans may even intensely dislike this album and, by the same token, I don't think we'll acquire many new fans from it. That doesn't really trouble me at all - there is a beauty about music when, on those very rare moments, it takes you to a level where you think it can't get any better. Perfection at a given moment. These feelings mixed with some of this subject matter, however, are deeply disturbing.

The track "Private" compiles various recordings and interviews with victims of domestic violence and child abuse. The track was assembled by Peter Sotos and was recorded and produced by Steve Albini in his Electrical Audio studio.

Track listing

Personnel
William Bennett - vocals, synthesizers, production
Peter Sotos - synthesizers, samples
Philip Best - synthesizers
Steve Albini - recording, production (on "Private")
Denis Blackham - mastering
Satoshi Morita - photography
G. Scott - photography
Alan Gifford - design
Trevor Brown - artwork

References

External links
 

1998 albums
Whitehouse (band) albums